Adrian Wilson (born 1964) is a British artist and photographer based in New York.

Biography

Early digital art career 

Wilson studied HND Design (photography) from 1984-1986 at Blackpool and The Fylde College, where, according to Digital Art historian Grant Taylor, he was one of the first photographers to specialize in digital image manipulation. Aly Ray Smith believes Wilson was the first photographer who specialized in creating images using a $250,000 digital paint system known as a Quantel Paintbox which was launched nine years before Adobe Photoshop. Wilson created one of the earliest photographic memes and was included in the international "Art & Computers" exhibition at Middlesbrough Institute of Modern Art in 1988. Wilson wrote for Computer Images magazine, was a guest speaker on digital art at Camberwell College of Art and created digital art for a range of clients, most notably for Creative Review magazine and the cover of Gold Mother by recording artists James. In 1990, Wilson stopped creating digital art and put his archive into storage.

As a result of the renewed interest in early digital art, Wilson scanned his Quantel Paintbox archive and decided to donate it to the UK's National Science & Media Museum. Wilson marked the 40th anniversary of the Paintbox's launch by writing an article for TVtech magazine and a talk for the Computer Arts Society.  On January 10, 2022, Blackpool School of Art, where Wilson first learned how to use the Quantel Paintbox, opened the first solo exhibition of his 1980's images.

Photography 
Wilson specializes in photographing interiors and was the photographer for all Mondiale Publishing magazines, shooting hundreds of nightclubs between 1988 and 2000. In 2004, Wilson moved to New York, where he currently shoots for clients including LVMH The New York Times and Architectural Digest.

Galleries and art installations 
Adrian Wilson salvaged a large collection of art from Manchester's textile warehouses in the 1980s, part of which is now displayed in the  Science & Industry Museum in Manchester and the Museum of Art and Photography in Bangalore.

Wilson has given various talks on the collection, including at Typecon and as an expert on the Antiques Roadshow when it visited Manchester. In 2015, Wilson created "The Inutilious Retailer", an interactive art exhibit which was open for 10 months on Ludlow Street, NYC and won a Store of the Year award.

In 2018, Wilson created the "Space X Gallery" which he hid above a fake Boring Company start-up office in a derelict building in the Lower East Side, a one-man "Introspective" show about Jerry Saltz  and a Native American art exhibition titled "Artonement".

Wilson opened the first gallery in Jean Michel Basquiat's last studio and home at 57 Great Jones St, NY and named it The "Same Old Gallery"

Art 
Wilson is mostly known for his street art, specifically his makeover of NYC street and subway signs to honor icons such as David Bowie, Prince. Eddie Van Halen, Aretha Franklin, which the MTA made into a permanent tribute. Wilson never signs his work and only admitted the works were his following his attainment of U.S. citizenship in 2020.

Following the $450 million sale of the much restored Salvator Mundi and an $800,000 complete set of Supreme skateboard decks, Wilson created the "Supreme Mundi", which in 2019 sold as the world's most expensive skateboard.

In response to COVID-19, Wilson created several pandemic-related pieces (now in permanent collections at the Royal College of Art and V&A Museum) and collaborated with Heidi Hankaniemi to create a "Hazmask suit and dress"  to promote mask wearing which went viral.

In 2021, Wilson purchased one of the last 5 remaining Quantel Paintboxes in North America and restored it to working order.

References

1964 births
Living people
British artists
British photographers